{{Album ratings
| rev1 = Allmusic
| rev1Score =  
| rev2 = Billboard
| rev2Score =  positive<ref name="Billboard">{{cite news|title=Billboards Top Album Picks |date=1980-09-13|work=Billboard| page=68}}</ref>}} Take What You Find''' is the twelfth studio album by Australian-American pop singer Helen Reddy that was released in 1980 by Capitol Records. It was her last album while under contract with the aforementioned record label before signing with MCA Records. Like the previous three -- We'll Sing in the Sunshine, Live In London, and Reddy—it failed to sell enough copies to reach Billboard magazine's list of the 200 Top LP's & Tapes of the week in the US but also became her first studio LP that didn't have a single appearing on either the Billboard Hot 100 or  the magazine's Easy Listening chart.



Single

The album version of the title song was released in the 7-inch format, and an extended version, which had a running time of 5:01, was printed as a 12-inch single. In his retrospective review of Reddy's 1983 album Imagination, Allmusic's Joe Viglione wrote, "It is interesting how the pop divas of the '70s and '80s took some risks." Olivia Newton-John's 1981 hit song "Physical" was banned by a few conservative radio stations at the time because of the sexually suggestive lyrics, but the view of casual sex that Reddy had already sung about the previous year in "Take What You Find" goes so far as to recommend taking any sexual encounter available, even if it means lowering one's standards:Instant love keeps it lightJust enough to fill the nightHigh ideals left behindLooking for love but you take what you findReception

Charles Donovan's retrospective review on Allmusic described the new tack Reddy was taking: "In search of a harder rock edge, Reddy employed Dr. Hook producer Ron Haffkine for Take What You Find, but despite tougher material like 'Killer Barracuda,' this was essentially another MOR-focused collection. Whatever artistic development there might have been failed to reverse Reddy's commercial decline." The reviewer for Billboard'' magazine also noted the different feel of this project. "The sound is funkier and harder-edged than we've come to expect from Reddy, as she tackles such tough topic matter as 'Killer Barracuda'," in which she describes a rather vicious love-'em-and-leave-'em type.

Track listing

Side 1
 "Take What You Find" (Julie Didier, Casey Kelly) – 3:06
 "Killer Barracuda" (Kris Kristofferson) – 3:08
 "A Way with the Ladies" (Dennis Locorriere, Ray Sawyer) – 2:48
 "Love's Not the Question" (Hazel Smith) – 3:34
 "Last of the Lovers" (Robert Byrne) – 3:10
Side 2
 "The One I Sing My Love Songs To" (Wayland Holyfield) – 3:10
 "Wizard in the Wind" (Andrew Paul) – 3:14
 "All I Really Need Is You" (Shel Silverstein) – 2:08
 "Midnight Sunshine" (Shel Silverstein) – 3:08
 "That Plane" (Dennis Locorriere, Ray Sawyer, Shel Silverstein) – 3:41

Personnel

Helen Reddy – vocals
Ron Haffkine – producer; musical director
Mike Lewis – string and horn arranger
Shane Keister – string and horn arranger; musician
Jim Cotton – recording engineer
Steve Melton – recording engineer
Chuck Ainlay – assistant engineer
David Cherry – assistant engineer
Pat Holt – assistant engineer
Joe Scaife – assistant engineer
Mary McLemore – assistant engineer
Ted Hacker – production coordinator
Skip McQuinn – production coordinator
Kevin Horan (Chicago Sun-Times) – photography
Roy Kohara – art direction 
Phil Shima – design

Mickey Buckins – musician
Larry Byrom – musician
Roger Hawkins – musician
David Hood – musician
Clayton Ivey – musician
Jimmy Johnson – musician
Mac McAnally – musician
Randy McCormick – musician
Rod Smarr – musician
The Shelly Kurland Strings – strings
The Nashville Horns – horns
Sheri Kramer – background vocals
Lisa Silver – background vocals
Diane Tidwell – background vocals

recorded at Muscle Shoals Sound Studio, Sheffield, AL, and Sound Lab, Nashville, TN

Notes

References

 

1980 albums
Capitol Records albums
Helen Reddy albums
Albums recorded at Muscle Shoals Sound Studio